Princess Caroline of Denmark (28 October 1793 – 31 March 1881), was the eldest surviving daughter of King Frederick VI of Denmark. She was unofficially known as "Kronprinsesse Caroline" (English: Crown Princess Caroline) prior to her marriage, and later as "Arveprinsesse Caroline"  (English: Hereditary Princess Caroline). She married her father's first cousin, Hereditary Prince Ferdinand, who was heir presumptive to the throne from 1848 to 1863.

Early life

Princess Caroline was born at Christiansborg Palace in Copenhagen on 28 October 1793. Her parents were Crown Prince Frederick (the future King Frederick VI of Denmark) and his spouse and first cousin, Princess Marie of Hesse-Kassel. Her paternal grandfather King Christian VII being mentally unstable, her father had acted as regent since 1784.
Her birth was much welcomed by the public, as her siblings had died soon after their birth.  
Four months after her birth, on 26 February 1794, Christiansborg Palace was destroyed by fire. Subsequently, Princess Caroline moved with her parents to Amalienborg Palace where she grew up, spending the summers at Frederiksberg Palace. At the death of her grandfather Christian VII of Denmark in 1808, her father ascended as king.

She had a very close relationship with her father. She was given a broad, but not very thorough or deep, education. Caroline was not described as either talented or beautiful. She met Hans Christian Andersen in 1822 and was very interested in his writing and adventure.
Her father had no surviving sons and Caroline and her sister Vilhelmine Marie (1808-1891),  were excluded from succession to the throne as a result of Salic Law. Despite this fact, however, she was still commonly called and referred to as Crown Princess prior to her marriage, as the eldest child of her father, though she did not have the formal title.

Marriage

Several possible marriages were planned for her but without result. After her father's accession, Napoleon suggested, in 1810, a marriage with the heir to the Swedish throne, Prince Christian August of Augustenborg; her father disapproved but began negotiations, which were interrupted by the death of Christian August shortly afterward. Among the grooms suggested was also the British Prince William, Duke of Clarence. In 1812, she was engaged to her uncle Prince Christian of Hesse, but he died in 1814. Finally, on 1 August 1829 at Frederiksberg Palace she married her father's first cousin, Prince Ferdinand of Denmark (1792-1863) who was third in line to the throne. The marriage was arranged for political reasons and was childless. After her marriage, she was no longer called crown princess until her spouse became hereditary prince.

In 1830, Caroline suffered terrible burn injuries in a fire, which disfigured her face; her hair ornament caught fire while she was reading in her bed, and she was severely burnt in the face and hair. The damage upon her looks was permanent, and she was later to remark, when she caught a glimpse of herself in a mirror, that she was sincerely grateful that she managed to acquire any friends who could stand to look at her face. She suffered a similar burn injury in 1858 when she burned her arm and shoulder so badly, that she had great pains for the rest of her life.

Between 1831 and 1839, she presided regularly at the supervision of the Aarhus troops. When her spouse was appointed General Commandant for Nørrejylland in 1839, she followed him on his inspection tour through the county's villages, and was celebrated by the public; she was a skillful rider, and when she followed her spouse on his inspections of the troops in Sjælland, she paraded herself on horse before the troops.
She founded an asylum in Aarhus (1836) and became the protector of Vallø Stift in 1852.

Hereditary Princess

After the death of her brother-in-law King Christian VIII in 1848, her husband became heir presumptive to the throne of Denmark and received the title of Hereditary Prince. Caroline now became hereditary princess again, but in contrast to the case before her marriage, she now received the title formally. She never became queen however, as Hereditary Prince Ferdinand died in 1863, shortly before his nephew King Frederick VII, and the throne passed to King Christian IX.

The spouses lived in Bernstorff Palace (Det Bernstorffske Palæ) in Bredgade which had been renovated for them by King Frederick VI, but did not play any active role at the royal court. Caroline eventually came to live quite harmoniously with her spouse. She tolerated his adultery and money problems. After her father's death in 1839, she became distanced from court. Her spouse was given the task of escorting  royal mistress Countess Danner (1815–1874) while she was estranged from the royal couple.
 
She was described as loyal, content and punctual She was especially loyal toward Copenhagen. She and her husband were the only members of the royal family during the cholera epidemic of 1853 out of loyalty to the city.

As a widow, she lived an isolated life, occupying herself by paying her husband's debts. During her final years, she became deaf.
Hereditary Princess Caroline died in her residence in Copenhagen on 31 March 1881.

Ancestry

References

Citations

Bibliography

 Bo Bramsen  (1969) Ferdinand og Caroline   (København: Politikens förlag)

External links

 The Danish Monarchy

1793 births
1881 deaths
Danish princesses
Norwegian princesses
Children of Frederick VI of Denmark
Burials at Roskilde Cathedral
Daughters of kings